Umang Jain is an Indian model and actress worked in national and international circuits. She is officially the youngest actor to have worked across all AV mediums and is awarded for the same. She is also popularly known as the 'Cadbury Girl' from where she rose to fame.

Career 
She began in the Hindi film industry with Love Breakups Zindagi and later appeared in Ek Tha Chander Ek Thi Sudha. In 2015, she portrayed Gauri, an incarnation of Devi/Durga in the three month television series, Maharakshak: Devi. She was cast in the role partly due to her background as a dancer and a brown belt in the martial arts. Jain states that she was drawn to the role because it was a challenging one.

Jain also portrayed Tara in the long-running show Yeh Rishta Kya Kehlata Hai on Star Plus. About her character, Umang said, "I play Tara in the show. She is a hockey player, who is slightly rough on the edges as she has been raised in a family of men but she is a soft and sweet person inside. She always stands up for what is right."

Television

Filmography

References

External links

Living people
Female models from Mumbai
Year of birth missing (living people)
Actresses from Mumbai
Actresses in Hindi cinema
Actresses in Malayalam cinema
Actresses in Hindi television
Indian television actresses
21st-century Indian actresses